Curly is a surname, given name or nickname.

Curly may also refer to:

Places
 Curly, County Tyrone, a townland in County Tyrone, Northern Ireland
 A nickname for Curl Curl, New South Wales, Australia
 Curly Creek Falls, American waterfalls

Other
 "Curly" (song), a 1969 song by The Move
 Curly: An Illustrated Biography of the Superstooge
 "Short and curlies" or just "curlies", a slang term for pubic hair

See also

 
 Curlee (disambiguation)
 Curley (disambiguation)
 Curli